Presidential elections were held in Liberia in 1857. The result was a victory for incumbent President Stephen Allen Benson.

References

Liberia
1857 in Liberia
Elections in Liberia
May 1857 events
Election and referendum articles with incomplete results